A magic polygon is a polygonal magic graph with integers on its vertices.

Perimeter magic polygon 
A magic polygon, also called a perimeter magic polygon, is a polygon with an integers on its sides that all add up to a magic constant. It is where positive integers (from 1 to N) on a k-sided polygon add up to a constant. Magic polygons are a generalization of other magic shapes such as magic triangles.

Magic polygon with a center point 
Victoria Jakicic and Rachelle Bouchat defined magic polygons as n-sided regular polygons with 2n+1 nodes such that the sum of the three nodes are equal. In their definition, a 3 × 3 magic square can be viewed as a magic 4-gon. There are no magic odd-gons with this definition.

Magic polygons and degenerated magic polygons 
Danniel Dias Augusto and Josimar da Silva defined the magic polygon P(n,k) as a set of vertices of  concentric n-gon and a center point. In this definition, magic polygons of Victoria Jakicic and Rachelle Bouchat can be viewed as P(n,2) magic polygons. They also defined degenerated magic polygons.

See also 
 Magic square

References

External links 
 https://udayton.edu/artssciences/academics/mathematics/images_and_files/umd_proceedings_files/2018/Jakicic-journal.pdf

Magic shapes